Old World Romance is the third full-length album by the indie rock band Sea Wolf, released in 2012 on Dangerbird Records.

Track listing

2012 albums
Dangerbird Records albums
Sea Wolf (band) albums